Rovescala is a comune (municipality) in the Province of Pavia in the Italian region Lombardy, located about 50 km southeast of Milan and about 25 km southeast of Pavia, in the Oltrepò Pavese.

References

Cities and towns in Lombardy